Makyla Smith (born 1982, 41 years old) is a Canadian actress who is well-known for playing as Daphne on Showtime's Queer as Folk.

Career 
She is best known for her supporting role as Justin's (Randy Harrison) best friend Daphne on Queer as Folk. She also appeared in the films The Matthew Shepard Story, Sex, Lies & Obsession, Owning Mahowny, Homeless to Harvard: The Liz Murray Story and Prom Queen: The Marc Hall Story.

Personal life 
She is mixed-race and is the daughter of the Barbados-born actress Alison Sealy-Smith and a English-Canadian man.

Filmography

Film

Television

External links

1982 births
Canadian television actresses
Living people
Canadian people of English descent
Canadian people of Barbadian descent
Black Canadian actresses
Canadian film actresses
Canadian voice actresses
20th-century Canadian actresses
21st-century Canadian actresses